Jyoti Devi is an Indian politician from Bihar and a Member of the Bihar Legislative Assembly. Devi won the Barachatti Assembly constituency on the Hindustani Awam Morcha (Secular) ticket in the 2020 Bihar Legislative Assembly election.

References

Living people
Bihar MLAs 2020–2025
Hindustani Awam Morcha politicians
Year of birth missing (living people)
Janata Dal (United) politicians